Patricia Ryan is an Irish judge who has been the President of the Circuit Court since 2019. She was appointed to the Circuit Court in 2002 and was formerly a barrister.

Early life 
Ryan attended University College Dublin and the King's Inns. She was called to the Irish Bar in 1984. She acted in cases including those involving personal injuries.

She was appointed a vice-chairperson of the Employment Appeals Tribunal in 1998 and was re-appointed in 2001.

Judicial career

Circuit Court 
Ryan was nominated to the Circuit Court in June 2002 and appointed in July 2002. She has presided over criminal law trials involving dangerous driving, manslaughter, fraud, sexual offences, theft, harassment, health and safety law, and drugs offences.

She sat on the Special Criminal Court.

President of the Circuit Court 
She became the President of the Circuit Court in July 2019.

Personal life 
Ryan married Brian Lenihan Jnr in 1997 with whom she had two children. Lenihan died in 2011.

References

Living people
Year of birth missing (living people)
Irish women judges
Alumni of University College Dublin
Alumni of King's Inns
21st-century Irish judges
21st-century women judges
Circuit Court (Ireland) judges
Presidents of the Circuit Court (Ireland)